Bernard J. Nottage, MD (23 October 1945 – 28 June 2017) was a Bahamian sprinter, gynecologist and politician. He competed in the men's 100 metres and 200 metres at the 1968 Summer Olympics. He finished sixth in the 1967 Pan American Games 200 metres.

Dr. Nottage attended the University of Aberdeen. His brother, Kendal, as youth and sports minister, was instrumental in bringing Muhammad Ali to the Bahamas for his controversial last fight in December 1981.

Biography
Nottage was born in Nassau, Bahamas, in October 1945. He attended the University of Aberdeen in Scotland, studying medicine. Whilst at Aberdeen, he won athletics titles in the 100 yards and 200 yards in three consecutive years in the late 1960s. He also competed internationally for Scotland during the same time.

At the 1967 Pan American Games in Winnipeg, Nottage finished in sixth place in the men's 200 metres. The following year, at the 1968 Summer Olympics in Mexico City, Nottage competed in three events. He competed in the men's 100 metres, the men's 200 metres, and the men's 4 × 100 metres relay, but did not advance from the heats in any of the events. In the relay event, the team set a new national record that lasted for 25 years.

In 1976, Nottage became the President of the Bahamas Amateur Athletic Association, and became the President of the Central American and Caribbean Athletic Confederation six year later. In 1988, he was elected to a vice-presidential regional role of the International Amateur Athletic Federation (IAAF).

Nottage returned to the Bahamas and had a career in obstetrics and gynecology. In 1986, he went on to become the medical director at St. Luke's Medical Center in Nassau. A year later, Nottage became an MP with the Progressive Liberal Party. His political career continued, and he served as the Minister of Health, the Minister of Education, the Minister of Consumer Affairs, and the Minister of National Security. In 2000, he resigned from the Progressive Liberal Party to become the leader of the Coalition for Democratic Reform party.

He died in June 2017 in Florida, at the age of 71, with his body lying in state at the House of Assembly.

References

External links
 

1945 births
2017 deaths
Athletes (track and field) at the 1968 Summer Olympics
Bahamian male sprinters
Olympic athletes of the Bahamas
Athletes (track and field) at the 1966 British Empire and Commonwealth Games
Athletes (track and field) at the 1970 British Commonwealth Games
Commonwealth Games competitors for the Bahamas
Athletes (track and field) at the 1967 Pan American Games
Pan American Games competitors for the Bahamas
Sportspeople from Nassau, Bahamas
Bahamian sportsperson-politicians
Members of the House of Assembly of the Bahamas
Members of the Senate of the Bahamas
Progressive Liberal Party politicians
Bahamian gynecologists
Alumni of the University of Aberdeen